Vasilios Xanthis (born 11 February 1968) is a retired Greek football midfielder.

References

1968 births
Living people
Greek footballers
Kastoria F.C. players
Ethnikos Piraeus F.C. players
Apollon Smyrnis F.C. players
Athlitiki Enosi Larissa F.C. players
Ethnikos Asteras F.C. players
Super League Greece players
Association football midfielders
Footballers from Kastoria